Filip Marchwiński (born 10 January 2002) is a Polish professional footballer who plays as an attacking midfielder for the club Lech Poznań.

Professional career
Marchwiński is a youth product of Lech Poznań, and was registered to their first team squad on 12 December 2018. On 16 December 2018, he made his professional debut with Lech Poznań in a 6-0 Ekstraklasa away win over Zagłębie Sosnowiec and scored his team's final goal, becoming the youngest Ekstraklasa scorer in club's history, at the age of 16 years and 340 days.

Career statistics

Club

Honours
Lech Poznań
 Ekstraklasa: 2021–22

References

External links
 
 
 Lech Poznań Profile

2002 births
Living people
Footballers from Poznań
Polish footballers
Poland youth international footballers
Poland under-21 international footballers
Lech Poznań II players
Lech Poznań players
Ekstraklasa players
II liga players
III liga players
Association football midfielders